Miss America 1971, the 44th Miss America pageant, was held at the Boardwalk Hall in Atlantic City, New Jersey on September 12, 1970. The Women's Liberation Front demonstrated at the event and Miss Iowa 1970, Cheryl Browne, was the first African American contestant in the history of the Miss America pageant. Miss South Dakota 1970 Mary Harum (Mary Hart) and Miss New Jersey 1970 Hela Yungst would both become media personalities.

Miss Texas 1970, Phyllis George, was crowned Miss America 1971. George would later become a noted media personality, featured on the CBS football program The NFL Today, as well as the First Lady of Kentucky from 1979 to 1983.

In August 1971, George traveled to Vietnam with Miss Nevada 1970, Vicky Jo Todd, Miss New Jersey 1970, Hela Yungst, Miss Arizona 1970, Karen Shields, Miss Arkansas 1970, Donna Connelly, Miss Iowa 1970, Cheryl Browne, and Miss Texas 1970 (George's replacement after she became Miss America), Belinda Myrick. They were participating in a 22-day United Service Organizations tour for American troops there. The tour began in Saigon. Browne later commented that she thought "it was one of the last Miss America groups to go to Vietnam."

Results

Order of announcements

Top 10

Top 5

Awards

Preliminary awards

Other awards

Judges
Hal David†
Dr. Zelma George
Bud Westmore†
Robert F. Lewine
Joan Crosby
Edward Loeb
Maria Gamarelli Fenton
Norton Mockridge†
Dr. W. Hugh Moomaw

Contestants

Photographs
It Happened Here in New Jersey - Contains photograph of Miss Iowa Cheryl Browne and Miss Maryland Sharon Ann Cannon in the period before the Miss America Pageant 1971 on September 8, 1970.
 Photographs taken at the MISS AMERICA U.S.O. SHOW to Vietnam in 1971

References

1971
1970 in the United States
1970 in New Jersey
September 1970 events in the United States
Events in Atlantic City, New Jersey